This is the discography of German pop singer Nena.

Studio albums

The Stripes
 1980: The Stripes

Nena (band)

Nena (solo)

Live albums

Video albums

Compilation albums

Charted compilations

Other compilations 
 1991: Tanz auf dem Vulkan
 1991: Nena die Band
 1999: Simply the Best: Nena
 2000: Leuchtturm
 2000: Hit Collection: Nena
 2000: Nena: Nur das Beste
 2003: Star Boulevard: Nena
 2004: Einmal ist keinmal (2-CD Set)
 2004: Maxis and Mixes
 2004: Irgendwie, irgendwo, irgendwann
 2006: Alles ... (3-CD Set)
 2006: Colour Collection: Nena
 2009: Nena: The Collection
 2013: The Essential: Nena (2-CD Set)

Soundtracks
 1996: Nena und die Bambus Bären Bande
 2003: Sams in Gefahr: Das Liederalbum

Children's albums
 1990: Komm, lieber Mai ... (aka Nena singt die schönsten Kinderlieder) — DE: 45
 1995: Unser Apfelhaus — DE: 69
 1997: Nenas Weihnachtsreise — DE: 28
 1999: Nena macht ... Rabatz
 2002: Tausend Sterne
 2002: Madou und das Licht der Fantasie
 2008: Himmel, Sonne, Wind und Regen
 2008: Dein Herz für Kinder (with Peter Maffay and Rolf Zuckowski) — DE: 82
 2012: Alle Kinder Lieben Nena: Die Kinderlied (Compilation, 3-CD Set)
 2013: Liederbox Vol. 1 (Compilation, 3-CD Set)
 2014: Die 1x1 CD mit den Hits von Nena (with Lisa, Leni and Malin) — DE: 78

Multi-artist mutual covers albums
 2016: Sing meinen Song - Das Tauschkonzert Vol.3 — DE: 2
 2016: Sing meinen Song – Das Weihnachtskonzert Vol.3 — DE: 15

Singles

Nena (band)

Nena (solo)

As featured artist 
 2017: "Only You" - Zara Larsson feat. Nena

References 

Discographies of German artists